The ICC Men's T20I Team Rankings is an international Twenty20 cricket rankings system of the International Cricket Council. After every T20I match, the two teams involved receive points based on a mathematical formula. The total of each team's points total is divided by the total number of matches to give a rating, and all teams are ranked on a table in order of rating. According to the ICC website, "teams will need to play six matches against other teams in the previous three to four years to remain in the rankings table."

India currently leads the ICC Men's T20I Team Rankings as of 01 February 2023.

Current rankings
…

Points calculations

Time period

Each team scores points based on the results of their matches over the last 3−4 years − all matches played in the 12–24 months since the May before last, plus all the matches played in the 24 months before that, for which the matches played and points earned both count half. Each May, the matches and points earned between 3 and 4 years ago are removed, and the matches and points earned between 1 and 2 years ago switch from 100% weighting to 50% weighting. For example, on 1 May 2014, the matches played between May 2010 and April 2011 were removed, and the matches played between May 2012 and April 2013 switched to 50% weighting (the matches from May 2011 to April 2012 would have already been at 50% following the previous rerating). This happens overnight, so can result in teams changing positions in the ranking table despite not playing.

Find the points earned from a match
Each time two teams play another match, the rankings table is updated as follows, based on the ratings of the teams immediately before they played. To determine the teams' new ratings after a particular match, first calculate the points earned from the match:

If the gap between the ratings of the two teams before the match was less than 40 points, then points will be as follows:

If the gap between the ratings of the two teams before the match was at least 40 points, then points will be as follows:

Example
Suppose Team A, with an initial rating of 100, plays Team B. The table shows the points awarded to the two teams for 9 different initial ratings for B (ranging from 20 to 160), and the three possible match results.

This illustrates that:
 The winning team earns more points than the losing team. (Unless the ratings are more than 180 apart and the weaker team wins − highly unlikely.)
 Winning always earns a team 100 points more than losing, and 50 more than tying.
 The total points earned by the two teams is always the same as the total initial ratings of the two teams.
 The points earned by a winning team increases as the initial rating (quality) of the opposition increases, within the constraints of earning at least its own initial rating + 10, and no more than its own initial rating + 90. A winning team therefore always earns more points than its initial rating, increasing its overall average rating.
 The points earned by a losing team increases as the initial rating (quality) of the opposition increases, within the constraints of earning at least its own initial rating − 90, and no more than its own initial rating − 10. A losing team therefore always earns fewer points than its initial rating, decreasing its overall average rating.
 In a tie, the weaker team usually earns more points than the stronger team (unless the initial ratings are at least 80 apart), reflecting the fact that a tie is a better result for the weaker team than the stronger team. Also, the stronger team will earn fewer points than its initial rating, decreasing its average, and the weaker team more points that its initial rating, increasing its average.
 For a given result, the rule of how the two teams' points are calculated changes as the initial ratings change, from being based on teams' own ratings when one team is far stronger, to being based on the opponent's ratings when the teams are closely matched, back to being based on own ratings when the other team is far stronger. However, despite these sudden changes in the rule, the number of points awarded for each result changes smoothly as the initial ratings change.

Find the new ratings
 Each team's rating is equal to its total points scored divided by the total matches played. (Series are not significant in these calculations).
 Add the match points scored to the points already scored (in previous matches as reflected by the table), add one to the number of matches played, and determine the new rating.
 Points earned by teams depend on the opponent's ratings, therefore this system needed to assign base ratings to teams when it started.

Historical rankings 
This table lists the teams that have historically held the highest rating since the T20I rankings was introduced. In April 2018, the ICC decided to grant full T20I status to all its members. As a result, ratings of leading teams since 2018 have been considerably higher, and cannot be directly compared to those before that date.

The summary of teams that have held the highest rating by days, are:

See also 

ICC Men's ODI Team Rankings
ICC Men's Test Team Rankings
ICC Women's ODI and T20I rankings
List of Twenty20 International Records
International cricket
ICC Player Rankings

References

External links
ICC Men's T20I Team Rankings

Men's T20I Team Rankings
Sports world rankings